Xyris operculata, the tall yellow-eye found in south eastern Australia. Seen in swampy areas, often in heathland. A tufted herb, growing up to 1 metre high. This is one of the many plants first published by Jacques Labillardière, appearing in his Novae Hollandiae Plantarum Specimen in 1805. The specific epithet operculata is derived from Latin. Referring to the hardened tip of the fruiting capsule, which does not divide when the capsule splits, and may be seen being cast aside like a lid.

References

gracilis
Flora of New South Wales
Flora of Queensland
Flora of Tasmania
Flora of Victoria (Australia)
Plants described in 1805